|}

The John Musker Fillies' Stakes is a Listed flat horse race in Great Britain open to fillies and mares aged three years or older. It is run at Yarmouth, over a distance of 1 mile, 2 furlongs and 23 yards (2,033 metres) and it is scheduled to take place each year in September. It was first run in 1993.

Records

Leading jockey (2 wins):
 Frankie Dettori - Echoes In Eternity (2003), So Mi Dar (2016)
 Darryll Holland – Entice (1997), Miss Corniche (2002)
 Ryan Moore - Nouriya (2010), Ville De Grace (2021)
 Philip Robinson - Gino's Spirits (1999), Dance Partner (2006)
 Seb Sanders - Courting (2000), Samira Gold (2007)

Leading trainer (6 wins):
 John Gosden – Saafeya (1998), Dance Partner (2006), So Mi Dar (2016), Fanny Logan (2019), Majestic Noor (2020), Shaara (2022

Winners

See also
 Horse racing in Great Britain
 List of British flat horse races

References

Racing Post: 

Flat races in Great Britain
Middle distance horse races for fillies and mares
Recurring sporting events established in 1993
1993 establishments in England